XHPER-FM is a noncommercial radio station on 101.1 FM in Perote, Veracruz, Mexico. It is owned by RRADIOTL, A.C. and known as La Inolvidable 101.1 FM.

History
XHPER received its concessions on February 29, 2016, and came to air in 2018.

References

Spanish-language radio stations
Radio stations in Veracruz
Radio stations established in 2018
2018 establishments in Mexico